Cyperus panamensis is a species of sedge that is native to southern parts of North America, parts of Central America and northern parts of South America.

See also 
 List of Cyperus species

References 

panamensis
Plants described in 1925
Flora of Mexico
Flora of Colombia
Flora of Costa Rica
Flora of Ecuador
Flora of El Salvador
Flora of Honduras
Flora of Guatemala
Flora of Peru
Flora of Panama
Flora of Nicaragua
Flora of Paraguay
Taxa named by Nathaniel Lord Britton